Nekhoteyevka is a rural locality (a khutor) in Belgorodsky District, Belgorod Oblast, Russia. The population was 145 as of 2010. There are 3 streets.

Geography 
Nekhoteyevka is located 24 km southwest of Maysky (the district's administrative centre) by road. Zhuravlyovka is the nearest rural locality.

References 

Rural localities in Belgorodsky District